Deals on Wheels was a British television series originally shown on UK TV Channel 4, and later on the Discovery Channel, fronted by Mike Brewer (born 28 August 1964) (age 58) and Richard Sutton born (15 June 1970 - died 2 January 2014) (age 44).

The original run of the series was between 1997 and 2001, with five seasons. For season 1, the show was set in a fictional garage. Season 2 was set in a different garage, but for seasons 3 and 4, the show was set in an alley garage, sited off a fictional street. Sutton left the show in 2000 due to his death in January 2014, leaving Brewer to continue. The series was cancelled in 2001 to make way for Wheeler Dealers, also with Brewer and due to Richard Sutton’s Death in 2014 the show will not be coming back after it ended in 2001.

External links

1997 British television series debuts
2001 British television series endings
Automotive television series